is a retired male freestyle swimmer from Japan. He represented his native country at the 1996 Summer Olympics in Atlanta, Georgia.

References
 Profile

1976 births
Living people
Japanese male freestyle swimmers
Olympic swimmers of Japan
Swimmers at the 1996 Summer Olympics
People from Okayama Prefecture
Asian Games medalists in swimming
Asian Games gold medalists for Japan

Medalists at the 1998 Asian Games
Swimmers at the 1998 Asian Games
20th-century Japanese people